American Standard is the twentieth studio album by American singer-songwriter James Taylor released on February 28, 2020 by Fantasy Records. It consists of his interpretations of standard songs from the American canon. It won Best Traditional Pop Vocal Album at the 63rd Annual Grammy Awards.

This album was produced, recorded and mixed by Dave O'Donnell and co-produced by John Pizzarelli and James Taylor. Mastered by Ted Jensen at Sterling Sound Nashville.

Critical reception

American Standard received generally positive reviews from critics. At Metacritic, which assigns a normalized rating out of 100 to reviews from critics, the album received an average score of 60, which indicates "generally favorable reviews", based on 8 reviews.

Track listing

Over the Rainbow: The American Standard EP

Album credits

Recorded at
 TheBarn, Washington, MA
 United Recording Studios, Hollywood, CA
 Capitol Studios, Los Angeles, CA
 Treasure Isle Studios, Nashville, TN
 Blackbird Studios, Nashville, TN
 Mixed at TheBarn and Studio D, NY
 Mastered by Ted Jensen at Sterling Sound, Nashville, TN
 Additional mastering for vinyl by Ryan Smith at Sterling Sound, Nashville, TN

Musicians
 James Taylor – vocals, acoustic guitar
 John Pizzarelli – rhythm guitar
 Michael Landau – lead guitar
 Jimmy Johnson – bass
 Steve Gadd – drums
 Larry Goldings – piano, keyboards
 Luis Conte – percussion
 Dorian Holley – vocals
 Kate Markowitz – vocals
 Arnold McCuller – vocals
 Caroline Taylor – vocals
 Andrea Zonn – violin, vocals
 Jerry Douglas – Dobro
 Viktor Krauss – double bass
 Stuart Duncan – violin
 Louis Marini, Jr. – saxophones, flute, clarinet
 Walter Fowler – trumpets, flügelhorn

Production
 Ted Jensen – master engineer 
 Jerry Douglas – engineer, producer
 Justin Shturtz – mastering assistant 
 James Taylor, Dave O'Donnell, John Pizzarelli – production

Charts

Weekly charts

Year-end charts

See also
List of 2020 albums

References

2020 albums
James Taylor albums
Fantasy Records albums
Grammy Award for Best Traditional Pop Vocal Album
Covers albums